Claudia Emmanuela Santoso (born 27 October 2000) is an Indonesian singer. She is known for winning the ninth season of The Voice of Germany and became the first person of asian descent who won the title, broadcast by the German television channels ProSieben and Sat.1 in 2019. She started gaining wide public attention after performing her rendition of The Greatest Showman soundtrack "Never Enough" in the blind audition The Voice of Germany. The footage of her blind audition has been one of the most viewed videos in The Voice of Germany history. Before joining The Voice of Germany, she also took part in many children's singing competitions in Indonesia such as Akademi Fantasi Indosiar Junior in 2008, Idola Cilik in 2011 and Mamamia Show in 2014.

Life and career 

Santoso attended music school since the age of 4. She participated in the talent search events in Indonesia, including AFI Junior in 2008, Idola Cilik in 2011 and Mamamia Show in 2014.

Santoso‘s maternal uncle encouraged her to pursue her higher education in Germany and sent her to a German language course at the Goethe-Institut Indonesia in Bandung up to the A1 level. During her school holiday, she attended Inlingua Language School in Munich, taking A2 level courses. After graduation from high school in 2018, Santoso attended the University of Munich in Germany.

In February 2019, Santoso auditioned for The Voice of Germany in Munich, competing against approximately 2,000 participants. She passed through the competition to the Blind Audition stage.

During the Blind Audition stage, Santoso performed the song "Never Enough" from the soundtrack of the film The Greatest Showman. She chose Alice Merton as her coach. The video of her Blind Audition performance became one of the most watched videos in The Voice of Germany history.

During the televised competition, Santoso performed the songs "Castles", "I Have Nothing" and "Goodbye". With 46.39% of the popular vote, Santoso was declared the winner of The Voice of Germany season 9 and was the first Asian to win the event.

On the final of The Voice of Germany, Santoso sang her first single, "Goodbye," as a duet with Merton. The song was released on November 10, 2019 and appeared on the charts on iTunes Indonesia and several European countries.

Performances on The Voice of Germany 2019

Discography

Single
 "Goodbye" (2019)

Concert tours 
Headlining
The Voice of Germany: Live in Concert (2019)

References

External links

Claudia Emmanuela Santoso on YouTube

2000 births
21st-century Indonesian women singers
Indonesian people of Chinese descent
People from Cirebon
Living people
Indonesian expatriates in Germany
The Voice (franchise) winners
Winner09